Safford Hill is a mountain in Schoharie County, New York. It is located east of North Blenheim. Brown Mountain is located southwest and Leonard Hill is located southeast of Safford Hill.

References

Mountains of Schoharie County, New York
Mountains of New York (state)